Helena Svensson (born 21 March 1979) is a retired Swedish professional golfer who played on the Ladies European Tour. She won the 2001 European Ladies' Team Championship and the 2003 Acer South African Women's Open.

Career
As an amateur, Svensson was part of the National Team and represented Sweden at the 1999 European Ladies' Team Championship where her team finished fifth, and again in 2001 when she won together with teammates Kristina Engström, Anna Gertsson, Mikaela Parmlid, Nina Reis and Linda Wessberg. She again represented her country at the 2002 Espirito Santo Trophy, together with Karin Sjödin and Mikaela Parmlid.

Svensson finished runner-up at the 2002 Kalmar Ladies Open on the Swedish Golf Tour, after losing a playoff to Australian Susie Mathews. Mathews won after eight playoff holes, while home player Åsa Gottmo was eliminated after four. Svensson won the 2002 Skandia PGA Open a few weeks later, a tournament she came close to winning again in 2004, finishing a stroke behind winner Linda Wessberg.

Svensson finished fourth at the LET Q-School in 2002, turned professional, and joined the 2003 Ladies European Tour.

In January 2003, she received the PGA Future Fund Award from the Swedish Golf Federation as that year's most promising Swedish international tour rookie alongside Fredrik Widmark.

In March 2003, she won the Acer SA Women's Open at Royal Johannesburg & Kensington Golf Club. She finished 94th on the LET Order of Merit both in 2003 and 2004.

Professional wins (3)

Sunshine Ladies Tour (1)
 2003 Acer South African Women's Open

Swedish Golf Tour (2)

Team appearances
Amateur
European Ladies' Team Championship (representing Sweden): 1999, 2001 (winners)
Espirito Santo Trophy (representing Sweden): 2002

References

External links

Swedish female golfers
Ladies European Tour golfers
Sportspeople from Kronoberg County
People from Ljungby Municipality
1979 births
Living people